Area codes 916 and 279 are California telephone area codes that serve Sacramento, the state capital, and most of its suburbs. Area code 916 was one of the first three original area codes established in California in October 1947. It originally covered most of Northern California, but area code splits have reduced its coverage to the greater Sacramento area. Area code 279 began service in March 2018 to relieve an exhausted supply of telephone numbers in the 916 area code.

History
Originally, the plan area covered the far northern portion of the state. In 1950, as part of a realignment of California's area codes, 916 was rotated to cover the northeastern corner of California, from the Sierra Nevada to the Central Valley. This involved changing Sacramento from area code 415 to 916.

The numbering plan area was split in a flash-cut on March 1, 1959, when area code 707 was created out of the northwest portion. On November 1, 1997, it was split again. The northeastern portion, including Redding, Yreka and Mount Shasta, became area code 530, reducing the 916 numbering plan area to Sacramento and its immediate area. On the same day, Dixon was reassigned from 916 to 707. This split left 916 as the only one of the original 86 area codes that no longer covers any part of its original area.

In 2017, the CPUC approved an overlay area code to take effect in 2018, as all available prefixes were expected to be allocated by December 2018. On February 9, 2017, the CPUC announced that the new overlay area code would be area code 279. The new area code began service on March 10, 2018.

Towns and cities
Area codes 916 and 279 encompass Sacramento and its surrounding suburbs:

El Dorado County
El Dorado Hills

Placer County

Granite Bay
Lincoln
Loomis
Newcastle
Penryn
Rocklin
Roseville

Sacramento County

Antelope
Arden-Arcade
Carmichael
Citrus Heights
Elk Grove
Fair Oaks
Florin
Folsom
Foothill Farms
Gold River
Isleton
La Riviera
Locke
McClellan Park
North Highlands
Orangevale
Parkway-South Sacramento
Rancho Cordova
Rancho Murieta
Rio Linda
Rosemont
Sacramento
Vineyard
Walnut Grove
Wilton

Sutter County
Pleasant Grove

Yolo County

Clarksburg
West Sacramento

See also
List of California area codes
List of NANP area codes
North American Numbering Plan

References

External links

 List of exchanges from AreaCodeDownload.com, 916 Area Code

916
916
Northern California
Telecommunications-related introductions in 1947